The alveolo-palatal ejective fricative is a type of consonantal sound, used in some spoken languages.

Features
Features of the alveolo-palatal ejective fricative:

Occurrence

See also
 Index of phonetics articles

External links
 

Fricative consonants
Alveolar consonants
Palatal consonants
Ejectives
Oral consonants
Central consonants